Paty Hollow is a valley in Oregon County in the U.S. state of Missouri named after Buck Paty, a pioneer settler.

References

Valleys of Oregon County, Missouri
Valleys of Missouri